Deep End may refer to:

Music 
Deep End (band), a rock band
Deep End, a 1975 album by Isotope
"Deep End", a song by Birdy, from the 2016 Beautiful Lies (Birdy album)
"Deep End", a song by Lykke Li, from the 2018 album So Sad So Sexy
The Deep End (Spyro Gyra album), 2004
The Deep End (Madrugada album), 2005
The Deep End (Rupert Hine album), 1994
The Deep End, Volume 1, by Gov't Mule
The Deep End, Volume 2, by Gov't Mule
Deep End (Tsunami album), 1993
"Deep End" (Fousheé song), 2020
"The Deep End", a song by Crossfade from the album Crossfade
"The Deep End", a song by Scary Kids Scaring Kids from the album Scary Kids Scaring Kids

Literature 
The Deep End, a 1952 novel by Fredric Brown
The Deep End, a 1992 novel by Chris Crutcher
"Deep End" (short story), a 1961 short story by J. G. Ballard
Diary of a Wimpy Kid: The Deep End, a 2020 novel by Jeff Kinney

Television
Deep End (film), a 1970 film directed by Jerzy Skolimowski
The Deep End (film), a 2001 film starring Tilda Swinton
The Deep End (TV series), an American television series
The Deep End (2022 TV series), an American documentary miniseries
"The Deep End" (Gravity Falls), an episode of animated TV series Gravity Falls
"The Deep End" (Robot Chicken episode), an episode of the American television series Robot Chicken

Other 
The Deep End with Nick Michaels, an American radio music program
The deeper part of a swimming pool